Howard Brinker (died January 3, 2004) was an NFL assistant coach. He served as defensive coordinator for the Cleveland Browns and Cincinnati Bengals (1976–79).

Coaching Timeline
1952–1953 Cleveland Browns - Defensive Assistant
1954–1973 Cleveland Browns - DC
1976–1979 Cincinnati Bengals - DC

References 

Cleveland Browns coaches
Cincinnati Bengals coaches
2004 deaths
Year of birth missing
National Football League defensive coordinators